Use Your Illusion World Tour – 1992 in Tokyo I is a live VHS/DVD by American hard rock band Guns N' Roses.  Filmed live at the Tokyo Dome, Japan, on February 22, 1992, during the Japanese leg of the Use Your Illusion tour, this recording features the first half of the concert, the second half appearing on sister volume Use Your Illusion II. The VHS titles were distributed by Geffen Home Video in 1992.

The concert was originally recorded by Japan Satellite Broadcasting, Inc. for a programme to be aired on their TV channel, and that programme is split between the two DVDs or tapes.

The songs "Pretty Tied Up", "Don't Cry", "November Rain" and the second part of "Patience" from this event were used in the band's 1999 live album Live Era: '87-'93.

The cover is similar to the band's single cover used for "Live and Let Die".

The release is certified gold by the RIAA, selling 50,000 copies.

Track listing 
"Introduction": "Tokyo! Banzai motherfuckers! From Hollywood... Guns N Roses!"
"Nightrain"
"Mr. Brownstone"
"Live and Let Die"
"It's So Easy"
"Bad Obsession"
"Attitude"
"Pretty Tied Up"
"Welcome to the Jungle"
"Don't Cry" (Original)
"Double Talkin' Jive"
"Civil War"
"Wild Horses"/"Patience"
"November Rain"

Reviews 
Glenn Kenny writing for Entertainment Weekly described the video as "deadly dull" and as having a "wimpy sound mix" before awarding it a 'D' grade (on a scale of A-F, A being the highest). Eamonn McCusker reviewed the DVD version for The Digital Fix, and was also critical of the video's production, describing it as an "uninspired recording". "Many fans will be disappointed with this video," warned Barry Weber for AllMusic, criticizing their tendency to overdo it on stage.

Credits 
Uzi Suicide Co.; an original production of TDK Core Co., Ltd. and Japanese Satellite Broadcasting

Artists 

Guns N' Roses:
W. Axl Rose – lead vocals, piano, whistling
Slash – lead guitar, backing vocals
Duff McKagan – bass, backing vocals, lead vocals
Matt Sorum – drums, percussion, backing vocals
Dizzy Reed – keyboards, percussion, backing vocals
Gilby Clarke – rhythm guitar, backing vocals

Guests:
Cece Worrall-Rubin, Lisa Maxwell, Anne King – horns
Tracey Amos, Roberta Freeman – backing vocals
Teddy Andreadis – keyboards, harmonica, backing vocals

Crew 

Director: Paul Becher
Producers: Shuji Wakai, Tsugihiko Imai, Tamamatsu Kuwata, Ichiro Misu, Yasumi Takeuchi, Noboru Shimasaki, Reiko Nakano, Shigeo Iguro
Light Design: Phil Ealy
Sound Engineers: David Kehrer, Jim Mitchell
Art Director: Kevin Reagan

Certifications

References

External links 

Guns N' Roses video albums
Albums recorded at the Tokyo Dome
Geffen Records video albums
1992 video albums